Jaitak Fort is situated about 15 km from district headquarters Nahan in District Sirmour in the Himachal Pradesh state of India. Situated 1479 meters above sea level, fort Jaitak is notable due to its location and affords a view of the surrounding countryside due to its strategic setting.

History 
Jaitak Fort, situated in the Jaitak Hills, is believed to have been built using the material recovered from the destroyed Nahan Fort. The Jaitak Fort was built by the Gurkha leader, Ranjor Singh Thapa, and his brave men in 1810, after attacking and ransacking the Nahan Fort and Palace.

It was here that the most important battle was fought between the British forces and the Gurkhas. From the Gurkhas, Kaji Amar Singh Thapa led the Kingdom of Nepal's Army. The battle fought between 26 December 1814 to 15 May 1815. As a result, the Nepali Army defeated the British and Sirmour joint army under the leadership of Amar Singh Thapa. 600 soldiers were reported to die in this war.

Location 
About 15 km to the north of Nahan, Jamta falls on the Nahan-Dadahu motorable road.  An ascent of about 3 km has to be negotiated form Jamta to gain Jaitak.  A hill fortress one crowned the Jaitak hill which is a steep ridge of slate and which rises above the Kayarda Dun, 30–36’ north and 77-24’ east, in the Nahan tehsil. The elevation above the sea level is about 1479 m.

Gallery

References 

Forts in Himachal Pradesh
Buildings and structures in Sirmaur district